Single is a national park in New South Wales, Australia, 432 km north of Sydney. The park was established in 1999 and has an area of 25.63 km2. The average elevation of the terrain is 1033 meters.

See also
 Protected areas of New South Wales

References

National parks of New South Wales
Protected areas established in 1999
1999 establishments in Australia